Neopholidophoropsis is an extinct genus of stem-teleost ray-finned fish that lived in what is now Germany during the Aptian stage of the Early Cretaceous epoch. It contains one species, Neopholidophoropsis serrata.

References

Prehistoric teleostei
Prehistoric ray-finned fish genera
Aptian genera
Early Cretaceous fish of Europe
Cretaceous Germany
Fossils of Germany
Fossil taxa described in 1981